Janice may refer to:

 Janice (given name), a feminine given name (includes a list of people with the name)
 Janice & Abbey, a reality TV series
 Processor codename of the Samsung Galaxy S Advance Android smartphone
 Janice, Łódź Voivodeship (central Poland)
 Janice, Lower Silesian Voivodeship (south-west Poland)
 Janice, Rimavská Sobota District, a village in southern Slovakia
 Janice, Mississippi, an unincorporated community in Perry County, Mississippi, United States

See also
 Janis (disambiguation)

cs:Seznam vedlejších postav v Přátelích#Janice Litman Goralnik
fi:Luettelo televisiosarjan Frendit hahmoista#Janice
sv:Vänner#Janice